Narangwal is a village in Ludhiana Punjab,  India, where most of the Grewal clan live. The Grewals are mainly Sikhs. The famous school Drishti Dr.R.C.Jain Innovative Public School is in Narangwal. 
Jaswinder Singh Grewal working at the "Nehru Planetarium, Rose Garden Ludhiana"  also belongs to this village

Sarpanch of the Village- Harinder Singh Grewal

Numbardaars of the Village-

 S. Gurjit Singh Grewal (Patti Bhara Mall)
 Baljit Kaur Grewal (Patti Raiki)
 baba Gurdit singh ji

Notable people
 Bhai Randhir Singh, Indian Freedom Fighter& Saint
 Gurnam Singh, ex-Chief Minister Punjab
Jaswinder Singh Grewal, Nehru Planetarium, Ludhiana

References

Villages in Ludhiana district